Sergio Fubini (December 31, 1928 – January 6, 2005) was an Italian theoretical physicist. He was one of the pioneers of string theory. He was engaged in peace activism in the Middle East.

Biography 
Fubini was born in Turin. In 1938, he fled the country as a politically persecuted Jew to Switzerland. In 1945, he attended the Lycée in Turin, where he studied physics and in 1950 graduated "cum laude." Afterwards, he was an assistant in Turin. From 1954 to 1957, he was in the USA. From 1958 to 1967, he was at CERN in Geneva. In 1959, he became a professor for nuclear physics at University of Padua. In 1961, he became a professor for theoretical physics at University of Turin. From 1968 to 1973, he was at MIT, but taught summer courses in Turin. He went back to CERN in 1973 and was from 1971 to 1980 a member of the advisory board and had an important role in planning the Large Electron Positron Collider (LEP) as well as in discussions for the construction of the Middle East's Synchrotron, SESAME.

At MIT, he was with Gabriele Veneziano, Emilio Del Giudice and Paolo Di Vecchia at the center of an active school of theoretical physicist with close connections to Italy (with one of the Italian INFN and MIT financed "Bruno Rossi" exchange programs). 
He and his co-workers did fundamental work in string theory.
Other well-known MIT colleagues at that time were Victor Weisskopf (who was recruited by Fubini to MIT), Steven Weinberg and Roman Jackiw.
From 1994 to 2001, he was a professor in Turin.
Fubini worked in the 1960s on current algebras and S-matrix theory (Regge trajectories among other things), in particular on their field-theoretical foundations. 
In the 1970s, he was with his MIT colleagues and pupils Gabriele Veneziano, Emilio Del Giudice and Paolo Di Vecchia one of the pioneers of string theory (the team introduced the so-called DDF states).
He worked in the 1970s on other classical solutions of Yang–Mills equations and conformally invariant quantum field theory.

Fubini died in 2005 in Nyon. He married Marina Colombo in 1956 and had a daughter with her.

Honors 
Fubini received the Dannie Heineman Prize for Mathematical Physics in 1968 and received an honorary doctorate from the University of Heidelberg.

References

External links 
 Memorial tribute by Sameen Ahmed Khan at the International Association of Mathematical Physics (2005). 
 Website on the history of SESAME
 Memorial tribute by Jackiw
 Memorial website at CERN
 Scientific publications of Sergio Fubini on INSPIRE-HEP

1928 births
2005 deaths
People associated with CERN
20th-century Italian Jews
Italian string theorists
Jewish physicists
Massachusetts Institute of Technology faculty
Scientists from Turin
Academic staff of the University of Padua
Academic staff of the University of Turin
Jews who emigrated to escape Nazism